The 2014 African Nations Championship Final was a football match that took place on 1 February 2014 at the Cape Town Stadium in Cape Town, South Africa, to determine the winner of the 2014 African Nations Championship. Libya defeated Ghana in the penalty kicks 4–3 after end of the game by the score of 0–0, Libya win their first international title.

Match

Lineups

References

External links 
Libya wins CHAN 2014 - CAF

2014
Final
Ghana national football team matches
Libya national football team matches
2013–14 in Libyan football
2013–14 in Ghanaian football
Association football penalty shoot-outs
February 2014 sports events in Africa